The 1909 Boston Doves season was the 39th season of the franchise.

The 1909 Doves set an MLB record that still stands for most games behind the first place winner in any season since 1900. They finished 65 1/2 games behind the NL Champs and eventual World Series champion Pittsburgh Pirates.

Regular season

Season standings

Record vs. opponents

Notable transactions 
 July 16, 1909: Charlie Starr and Johnny Bates were traded by the Doves to the Philadelphia Phillies for Buster Brown, Lew Richie and Dave Shean.

Roster

Player stats

Batting

Starters by position 
Note: Pos = Position; G = Games played; AB = At bats; H = Hits; Avg. = Batting average; HR = Home runs; RBI = Runs batted in

Other batters 
Note: G = Games played; AB = At bats; H = Hits; Avg. = Batting average; HR = Home runs; RBI = Runs batted in

Pitching

Starting pitchers 
Note: G = Games pitched; IP = Innings pitched; W = Wins; L = Losses; ERA = Earned run average; SO = Strikeouts

Other pitchers 
Note: G = Games pitched; IP = Innings pitched; W = Wins; L = Losses; ERA = Earned run average; SO = Strikeouts

Relief pitchers 
Note: G = Games pitched; W = Wins; L = Losses; SV = Saves; ERA = Earned run average; SO = Strikeouts

Notes

References 
1909 Boston Doves season at Baseball Reference

Boston Doves seasons
Boston Doves
Boston Doves
1900s in Boston